Edward Dunn may refer to:
 Edward Dunn (politician) (1880–1945), British Labour Party politician
 Edward John Dunn (1844–1937), Australian geologist
 Edward Dunn (bishop) (1868–1955), Anglican bishop who moved to Belize 
 Edward T. Dunn (1920–2016), American football player and coach
 Teddy Dunn (born 1980 as Edward Wilkes Dunn), Australian-born American stage, television and film actor
 Ed Dunn of Dunn Bros, an American coffeehouse franchise company founded 1987

See also
 Edward Dunne (disambiguation)
 Albert Dunn (Albert Edward Dunn, 1864–1937), British Liberal Party politician